The Office of the United States Assistant Secretary of the Army for Acquisition, Logistics, and Technology (ASA(ALT) pronounced A-salt) is known as OASA(ALT). OASA(ALT) serves, when delegated, as the Army Acquisition Executive, the Senior Procurement Executive, the Science Advisor to the Secretary of the Army, and as the senior research and development official for the Department of the Army. The OASA(ALT) also has the principal responsibility for all Department of the Army matters related to logistics.

Office symbol
In accordance with Army Regulation (AR) 25–59, OASA(ALT)'s office symbol is SAAL-ZA.

Components

 ASA(ALT) SAAL-ZA
 Principal Deputy ASA(ALT)
 Deputy Assistant Secretary for Data, Engineering, and Software SAAL-ZE
 Deputy Assistant Secretary for the Elimination of Chemical Weapons SAAL-ZC
 Deputy Assistant Secretary for Plans, Programs and Resources SAAL-ZR
 Chief Information Officer
 Deputy Assistant Secretary for Research and Technology SAAL-ZT
 Chairman Army Science Board SAAL-ASB
 Deputy Assistant Secretary for Procurement SAAL-ZP
 Deputy Assistant Secretary for Strategic Communication & Business Transformation SAAL-ZG
 Deputy Assistant Secretary for Acquisition Policy and Logistics SAAL-ZL
 Deputy Assistant Secretary for Defense Exports and Cooperation SAAL-ZN
 Deputy for Acquisition and Systems Management SAAL-ZS
 Principal Military Deputy/Director Acquisition Career Management/Chief Integration Officer
 Deputy for Medical Systems
 Director US Army Acquisition Support Center USAASC
 Director Chemical Materials Agency (CMA)
 JPEO Armaments & Ammunition (A&A)
 JPEO Chemical and Biological Defense (CBD)
 JPEO Joint Tactical Radio System (JTRS) 
 PEO Aviation (AVN)
 PEO Command Control Communications Tactical (C3T)
 PEO Combat Support & Combat Service Support (CS&CSS)
 PEO Enterprise Information Systems (EIS)
 PEO Ground Combat Systems (GCS) 
 PEO Intelligence, Electronic Warfare, and Sensors (IEW&S) 
 PEO Missiles and Space (M&S) 
 PEO Simulation, Training, & Instrumentation (STRI)
 PEO Soldier
 Direct Reports
 United States Army Acquisition Support Center (USAASC)
 Army Medical Research and Materiel Command (MRMC)
 Army Science Board
 ASA(ALT) System of Systems Engineering and Integration (ASA(ALT) SoSE&I)
 Life Cycle Management
 Acquisition, Logistics, and Technology Integration Office (ALT IO)
 Deputy for Life Cycle Integration
 Tank-Automotive Life Cycle Management Command (TACOM LCMC)
 Aviation and Missile Life Cycle Management Command (AMCOM LCMC)
 Communication-Electronics Life Cycle Management Command (C-E LCMC)
 Joint Munitions & Lethality Life Cycle Management Command (JM&L LCMC)

In role of Acquisition Executive
The ASA (ALT) is generally delegated the role of Acquisition Executive. (See Army Acquisition Corps) 

In June 2018 the Acquisition Executive launched  or Expeditionary Technology Search, a four-phase catalyst for the Army to engage with the community of innovators: 
 Concept white paper contest for technological ideas
 Up to 125 selected contestants pitch their ideas to a panel of Army experts 
 Up to 25 semifinalists will be featured at the Innovator's Corner of the annual AUSA meeting in November
 12 finalists in a Capstone Demonstration to DoD, for a $200,000 prize

The direct reports of the Acquisition Executive are Program Executive Officers for the respective Program Executive Offices (PEOs)

 JPEO Chemical and Biological Defense (CBD)
 JPEO Joint Tactical Radio System (JTRS) 
 PEO Ammunition (AMMO)
 PEO Aviation (AVN)
 PEO Command Control Communications Tactical (C3T)
 PEO Combat Support & Combat Service Support (CS&CSS)
 PEO Enterprise Information Systems (EIS)
 PEO Ground Combat Systems (GCS) 
 PEO Intelligence, Electronic Warfare, and Sensors (IEW&S) 
 PEO Missiles and Space (M&S) 
 PEO Simulation, Training, & Instrumentation (STRI)
 PEO Soldier

Chronological list of ASA(ALT)s

See also

 Army Science Board
 List of positions filled by presidential appointment with Senate confirmation
 Structure of the United States Army
 Under Secretary of Defense for Acquisition, Technology and Logistics
 United States Army Chemical Materials Agency
 Ultra-Large-Scale Systems

Notes

References

External links
 

 
United States defense procurement
Military simulation
United States Army civilians